Maison de Soul is a Louisiana-based Zydeco and blues record label. It was founded in 1974 in Ville Platte, Louisiana by Floyd Soileau and remains under his ownership. It is one of four record labels under Soileau's Flat Town Music Company umbrella, and combined the Flat Town labels make up "the largest body of Cajun, zydeco, and swamp music in the world". Living Blues magazine has called Maison de Soul "the country's foremost zydeco label".

Founding

By 1974, Floyd Soileau had already established two other record labels, Jin Records and Swallow Records.  Maison de Soul was founded in 1974 after a conversation between Soileau and zydeco star Clifton Chenier. Chenier had just finished recording a 1950s style album, when he shook his finger at Soileau and said "You know, Floyd Soileau, zydeco is where it's at. It's coming on strong, and you better get with it." Soileau took Chenier's advice and founded Maison de Soul, which was the first record label dedicated to producing zydeco music. Some of the early 45 RPM single releases featured New Orleans rhythm and blues artists such as Professor Longhair, Dr. John, and Johnny Adams, but after the label began producing LPs and CDs, the artist roster was comprised almost exclusively of zydeco musicians.

As a small, independent record label, Maison de Soul shares some of the same problems as other similar labels: getting the product to distributors and on the shelves of record stores, as well as getting their acts known. As a form of ethnic music, many potential buyers of zydeco aren't always familiar with the artists or their musical styles, so Maison de Soul has had success with issuing compilation albums by various artists, the best-selling one titled Zydeco Festival (1988). Some of these compilation albums have included a few Cajun musicians, although they are primarily focused on zydeco.

Soileau said that zydeco music sales in general and for Maison de Soul in particular were enhanced by the popularity of the 1987 film The Big Easy, which was set in and shot on location in New Orleans. The film's soundtrack was released on Island Records and featured several zydeco and Cajun music artists, as well as New Orleans R&B and gospel groups.

In addition to the market in Louisiana, Maison de Soul has exported its zydeco sound to the US East Coast and California, as well as Australia, Canada, and Europe. Soileau says sales are enhanced in areas where alternative radio stations have Louisiana "gumbo" type of programming.

Some of the top names in the Maison de Soul catalog are Clifton Chenier, Rockin' Dopsie, Boozoo Chavis, John Delafose, the band Zydeco Force, Willis Prudhomme, Lynn August, and Rockin' Sidney.

"My Toot Toot"

Maison de Soul had its biggest hit with the Rockin' Sidney song "My Toot Toot", released on Sidney's 1984 album My Zydeco Shoes Got the Zydeco Blues. The song was subsequently released as a single in January 1985 in Louisiana and Texas, and became a regional hit. The original recording was later leased to Epic Records who released it nationally, and made it to the Country Top 40 charts where it remained for 18 weeks. It was the first zydeco song to receive major airplay on pop, rock and country radio stations. Later in 1985, "My Toot Toot" was certified platinum and won the 1986 Grammy Award for Best Ethnic or Traditional Folk Recording. The song has been covered by artists as varied as Fats Domino, Rosie Ledet, Jean Knight, Terrance Simien, Doug Kershaw, Denise LaSalle, Jimmy C. Newman and John Fogerty. A Spanish version titled "Mi Cu-Cu" by La Sonora Dinamita sold over a million copies in Mexico, Central America, and South America and was a top-played song in the Latino radio market as late as 2011. A German beer company licensed it to use in their radio and television commercials. Decades after "My Toot Toot" debuted, it continued to draw royalties from commercial use in Europe, as well as earnings from cover versions in several languages by dozens of musicians.

Roster
The list below includes singles, studio or live albums, or appearances on MdS various artist compilation albums.

 Johnny Adams
 Donna Angelle
 Cory Arceneaux
 Chris Ardoin
 Lawrence Ardoin
 Morris Ardoin
 Lynn August
 Bad Weather
 Dewey Balfa & The Balfa Brothers
 Beau Jocque & Zydeco High Rollers
 Beau Michael
 BeauSoleil
 Big Red
 Eddie Bo
 Jeffery Broussard
 Angie Brown
 J. J. Caillier
 Roy Carrier
 The Carriére Brothers
 Gregg Chambers
 Boozoo Chavis
 Clifton Chenier
 Wilfred Chevis
 Creole Junction
 The Creole Zydeco Farmers
 John Delafose
 L.C. Donatto & the Drifters
 Michael Doucet
 Dr. John
 Thomas "Big Hat" Fields
 Morris Francis
 Keith Frank
 Preston Frank & His Zydeco Family Band
 Ann Goodly
 Gumbo Cajun Band
 Peppermint Harris
 Clarence "Frogman" Henry
 Jabo
 Donnie Jacobs
 Jambalaya Cajun Band
 Jean Pierre and the Zydeco Angels
 Jeremy & the Zydeco Hot Boyz
 Al "Carnival Time" Johnson
 Earl King
 Kuumba
 Wilfred Latour
 The Lawtell Playboys
 Morris Ledet
 Rosie Ledet
 Lil' Bob and the Lollipops
 Lil' Malcolm & the House Rockers
 Lil' Pookie
 Major Handy
 Chuck Martin
 Nathan & the Zydeco Cha Chas
 Olympia Brass Band
 J. Paul, Jr.
 Al Prince
 Professor Longhair
 Willis Prudhomme
 Rebirth Brass Band
 Jo Jo Reed
 Zachary Richard
 Tommy Ridgley
 Rockin' Dopsie
 Rockin' Sidney
 Roddie Romero
 Sam Brothers Five
 Terrance Simien
 Warren Storm
 T-Lou & His Los Angeles Zydeco Band
 Irma Thomas
 Leo Thomas
 Leroy Thomas
 Tabby Thomas
 Horace Trahan
 Frank Turner
 Walter "Wolfman" Washington
 Buckwheat Zydeco
 Zydeco Brothers
 Zydeco Force
 Zydeco Joe
 Zydeco Warriors
 Marc Zydiac

Awards

Maison de Soul recordings that have been nominated for awards include:

See also
 List of record labels

References

External links
 
 
 Flat Town Music Company website, Our history section

1974 establishments in Louisiana
American independent record labels
Record labels based in Louisiana
Blues record labels
Rhythm and blues record labels
Companies based in Louisiana
Music of Louisiana
Record labels established in 1974